The Pacific Association of Professional Baseball Clubs was an independent baseball league based in Northern California. The league was founded in 2013 by four former North American League teams.

History 
During the initial season, two Hawaii-based teams, the Hawaii Stars and the Maui Warriors, played inter-league games against the Baseball Challenge League of Japan; California teams played against the Freedom Pro League of Arizona.

Both Hawaii teams ceased operations after playing the 2013 season citing high travel costs of bringing in opponents from Northern California. The East Bay Lumberjacks also did not return for a second season.

Two expansion clubs were added in 2014 (the Sonoma Stompers and Pittsburg Mettle) bringing the total number of teams to four.

In 2017 San Francisco businessman and entrepreneur Jonathan Stone was named league commissioner.

Expansion came again in 2018 with the addition of the Martinez Clippers and Napa Silverados. This brought the league to an all-time high of six member clubs.

Before the 2019 season the league lost two teams, Martinez and Pittsburg, which both folded. The Salina Stockade were added to the league for 2019 as a travel team.

Prior to the 2020 season, San Rafael left the league for the Pecos League. The California Dogecoin was listed as an expansion team on the league website, but after the season was postponed by the COVID-19 pandemic were removed without having played a game. The 2020 season was officially cancelled on July 17, 2020. Later, the California Dogecoin formed the Liberation Professional Baseball League.

The Sonoma Stompers announced in October 2021 their intentions to join the California Collegiate League for 2022.

With no new news from the league's website and social media after the 2020 season cancellation, it is believed that the league has indeed folded.

Teams
{| class="wikitable"
|-
! style="background-color:#003366" colspan="8" | Pacific Association of Professional Baseball Clubs
|-
! Team
! Founded
! City
! Stadium
! Capacity
! Notes
|-
|East Bay Lumberjacks
|2013
|Concord, California
|Laney College
|250
| Travel team with limited home games. Did not return after 2013 season
|-
|Hawaii Stars
|2012
|Hilo, Hawaii
|Wong Stadium
|2,500
|Charter team. Were previous members of North American Baseball League in 2012. Folded after the 2013 season.
|-
|Martinez Clippers
|2018
|Martinez, California
|Joe DiMaggio Fields at Waterfront Park
|500
|Folded after the 2018 season.
|-
|Na Koa Ikaika Maui
|2010
|Maui, Hawaii
|Maehara Stadium
|1,500
|Charter team. Golden Baseball League 2010, North American Baseball League 2011-12. Folded after the 2013 season.
|-
|Napa Silverados
|2017
|Napa, California
|Miner Family Field
|600
|Team is currently inactive.
|-
|Pittsburg Diamonds
|2013
|Pittsburg, California
|Michael V Valle Stadium
|1,000
|Originally named the Pittsburg Mettle, the club changed their name to the Diamonds in 2015. Folded after the 2018 season.
|-
|Salina Stockade
|2016
|Salina, Kansas
|N/A
|N/A
|2019 Traveling Team. Previously in Pecos League 2016, American Association of Professional Baseball 2017, Can-Am League 2018, since moved back into Pecos league in 2020-21. Currently Inactive.
|-
|San Rafael Pacifics|2011
|San Rafael, California
|Albert Park
|1,500
|Charter team. Previously played in North American Baseball League 2012, have since moved to the Pecos League 2020-present.
|-
|Sonoma Stompers|2014
|Sonoma, California
|Arnold Field
|1,500
|Moved to the California Collegiate League in 2021.
|-
|Vallejo Admirals|2013
|Vallejo, California
|Wilson Park
|1,000 | 500
|Charter team. Currently inactive.
|-
|}

Teams that never played
 California Dogecoin''' of Fairfield, California – were to have played in the 2020 season, but instead played in the Liberation Professional Baseball League due to the Pacific Association postponing the season due to the COVID-19 pandemic.

League timeline

Champions

Awards

Players who advanced to Major League Baseball

RHP Logan Gillaspie (Sonoma 2017)
LHP Jared Koenig (San Rafael 2017-18)
RHP Chris Mazza (San Rafael 2018)

References

External links 

Book: The Only Rule Is It Has To Work

Professional sports leagues in the United States
Independent baseball leagues in the United States
2013 establishments in the United States
Baseball leagues in Hawaii
Baseball leagues in California